William James Touhey (March 23, 1906 — March 28, 1999) was a Canadian ice hockey player who played 280 games in the National Hockey League with the Montreal Maroons, Ottawa Senators, and Boston Bruins between 1927 and 1934.

Playing career
Bill broke in the league with the Montreal Maroons in the 1927–28 season. He was traded to the Ottawa Senators following the season. He played three seasons, then was loaned to Boston for the 1931–32 while the Senators were suspended. After the Senators were revived in 1932–33, he played two further seasons for the team, before leaving the NHL to play in the minors, starting in the 1934–35 season. He finished with 65 goals and 40 assists for 105 points in 280 NHL games.

After the NHL, he played three seasons with minor teams in the States before returning to the Ottawa Senators senior amateur team, where he finished his playing days in 1939–40.

When he died in 1999 he was the third last surviving member of the original Ottawa Senators of the NHL. William Hollett survived one month longer, and Teddy Saunders died in 2002.

Career statistics

Regular season and playoffs

External links
 

1906 births
1999 deaths
Boston Bruins players
Boston Cubs players
Buffalo Bisons (IHL) players
Canadian ice hockey left wingers
Ice hockey people from Ottawa
Montreal Maroons players
Ottawa Senators (1917) players
Ottawa Senators (QSHL) players
Philadelphia Arrows players
Stratford Nationals players
Syracuse Stars (IHL) players
Windsor Bulldogs (1929–1936) players
Canadian expatriate ice hockey players in the United States